The Running Man is a dystopian thriller novel by American writer Stephen King, first published under the pseudonym Richard Bachman in 1982 as a paperback original. It was collected in 1985 in the omnibus The Bachman Books. The novel is set in a dystopian United States during the year 2025, in which the nation's economy is in ruins and world violence is rising.

The story follows protagonist Ben Richards as he participates in the reality show The Running Man in which contestants, allowed to go anywhere in the world, are chased by the general public, who get a huge bounty if they kill him.

The book has a total of 101 chapters, laid out in a "countdown" format. The first is titled "Minus 100 and Counting ..." with the numbers decreasing, ending with the last chapter called "Minus 000 and Counting" (or, in some versions, simply "000").

The Running Man was very loosely adapted into a film with the same name in 1987, five years after the book was released. The adaptation only retained the general idea of the violent show and a few names. The film starred Arnold Schwarzenegger as Richards. The film was later made into a video game released on several home computer platforms. A new film adaptation of the novel is in development with Edgar Wright directing and Michael Bacall penning the screenplay.

Plot
In 2025, the world's economy is in shambles and America has become a totalitarian dystopia. 28-year-old Ben Richards, an impoverished resident of the fictional Co-Op City, is unable to find work, having been blacklisted from his trade. His gravely ill daughter Cathy needs medicine, and his wife Sheila has resorted to prostitution to bring in money for the family. In desperation, Richards turns to the Games Network, a government-operated television station that runs violent game shows. After rigorous physical and mental testing, Richards is selected to appear on The Running Man, the Network's most popular, lucrative, and dangerous program. He is interviewed by Dan Killian, the executive producer of the program, who describes the challenges he will face once the game begins. He also meets Fred Victor, the director of the show, and Bobby Thompson, the MC and host.

The contestant is declared an enemy of the state and released with a 12-hour head start before the Hunters, an elite team of Network-employed hitmen, are sent out to kill him. The contestant earns $100 per hour that he stays alive and avoids capture, an additional $100 for each law enforcement officer or Hunter he kills, and a grand prize of $1 billion if he survives for 30 days. Viewers can receive cash rewards for informing the Network of the runner's whereabouts. The runner is given $4,800 and a pocket video camera before he leaves the studio. He can travel anywhere in the world, and each day he must videotape two messages and mail them back to the studio for broadcasting. If he neglects to send the messages, he will be held in default of his Games contract and stop accumulating prize money, but will continue to be hunted indefinitely. Killian states that no contestant has survived long enough to claim the grand prize, nor does he expect anyone to ever do so. Richards simply hopes that he will last long enough to secure his family's future with his prize money.

As the game begins, Richards obtains a disguise and false identification records, traveling first to New York City and then Boston. In Boston, he is tracked down by the Hunters and only narrowly escapes, setting off an explosion in the basement of a YMCA building that kills five police officers. He sneaks away through a sewer pipe and emerges in the city's impoverished ghetto, where he takes shelter with gang member Bradley Throckmorton and his family. Richards learns from Bradley that the air is severely polluted and that the city's poor have become a permanent underclass. Bradley also says that the Network exists only as a propaganda machine to pacify and distract the public. Richards tries to incorporate this information into his video messages, but finds that the Network dubs over his voice with obscenities and threats during the broadcast.

Bradley smuggles Richards past a government checkpoint to Manchester, New Hampshire, where he disguises himself as a half-blind priest. In addition, Bradley provides Richards with a set of mailing labels for his videotapes that will leave the Network unable to track him by their postmarks. While spending three days in Manchester, Richards learns that another contestant has been killed, and he dreams that Bradley has betrayed him after being tortured. He travels to a safe house owned by a friend of Bradley in Portland, Maine, but is reported by the owner's mother. As the police and the Hunters close in on the safe house, Richards is wounded, but manages to escape and spends the night sleeping at an abandoned construction site. The next morning, after arranging to mail his videotapes, Richards carjacks a woman named Amelia Williams and takes her hostage. Alerting the media to his presence, he makes his way to an airport in Derry. The police confront Richards, but he bluffs his way onto a plane past both them and the lead Hunter, Evan McCone, by pretending to be carrying an explosive charge powerful enough to destroy the entire facility. By this time, Richards has broken the Running Man survival record of eight days and five hours.

Richards takes McCone and Amelia as hostages and has the plane fly low over populated areas to avoid being shot down by a surface-to-air missile. However, Killian calls Richards aboard the plane and reveals that he knows Richards has no explosives, as the plane's security system would have detected them. To Richards' surprise, Killian offers him a chance to replace McCone as lead Hunter. Richards is hesitant to take the offer, worried that his family will become a target. Killian then informs him that Sheila and Cathy were randomly murdered by three intruders, over ten days earlier, before Richards even first appeared on the show. Killian gives him some time to make his decision. Richards falls asleep and dreams of his murdered family and a gruesome crime scene. With nothing left to lose, he calls Killian back and accepts the offer. After the contact has been severed, he kills the flight crew and McCone, but suffers a mortal gunshot wound from the latter. Richards allows Amelia to jump off the plane with a parachute, and then uses his last strength to override the autopilot and fly toward the skyscraper serving as the headquarters of the Games Network.

The book ends with the plane crashing into the tower, resulting in the deaths of Richards and Killian. The novel closes with the description, "The explosion was tremendous, lighting up the night like the wrath of God, and it rained fire twenty blocks away."

Background

Richard Bachman
The Running Man is the last of four books written by King that were published between 1977 and 1982 under the name Richard Bachman, which were reissued in one volume as The Bachman Books (1985). The others are Rage (1977), The Long Walk (1979), and Roadwork (1981). King created "Richard Bachman" to be his long-term alias, not just a temporary writing identity, but the author's real identity was leaked to the media shortly after the publication of the fifth Bachman novel, Thinner (1984).

Although Bachman is now known to be King, King has revived the Bachman pen-name for two further novels: The Regulators (1996) and Blaze (2007). King also based The Dark Half, a horror novel published in 1989, on the outing of Bachman.

Writing the book
According to King's 2002 memoir On Writing: A Memoir of the Craft, he wrote The Running Man within a single week, compared to his normal 2,000-word or ten-page daily output—so that writing a novel normally takes approximately three months. In "The Importance of Being Bachman", a new introduction to the 1996 edition of The Bachman Books, King describes The Running Man as "a book written by a young man who was angry, energetic, and infatuated with the art and the craft of writing."

In the same introduction King describes Ben Richards as "scrawny" and "pre-tubercular". He observes that Arnold Schwarzenegger, who played Ben Richards in the film adaptation of The Running Man, portrayed the character very differently than he wrote about him in the book, saying that Richards (in the book) was "as far away from the Arnold Schwarzenegger character in the movie as you can get."

References

1982 American novels
1982 science fiction novels
Fiction set in 2025
American novels adapted into films
American science fiction novels
Fiction about death games
Dystopian novels
Novels by Richard Bachman
Fiction about snuff films
Signet Books books